The flag of Shetland is a white or silver Nordic cross on a blue background. The flag uses the colours of the flag of Scotland, but in the form of the Nordic cross in order to symbolise Shetland's historical and cultural ties with Scandinavia. The official recommended colour of the flag of Scotland is Pantone 300, which implies that this would be appropriate for the Shetland flag too, though the Flag Institute lists the colour as a similar Pantone 286. It was created by Roy Grønneberg and Bill Adams in 1969, to commemorate the 500th anniversary of the transfer of the islands from Norway in the Kalmar Union to Scotland and the 500 years before as part of Norway.

The flag is widely used privately by Shetlanders both on land and sea and is now seen as a symbol of the Shetland identity. In 2007 a "Shetland Flag Day" was introduced by the council, who hope the day will be used to "celebrate all things Shetland". After almost forty years of unofficial use, the flag was formally granted by the Lord Lyon King of Arms, the heraldic authority of Scotland, on 1 February 2005, in time for the Island Games in July 2005 in Shetland.

The flag is practically identical to the former unofficial national flag of Iceland (the Hvítbláinn) in use by Icelandic nationalist activists from 1897 until 1915, when it was in part abandoned due to its similarity to the Greek jack and the Swedish flag, which critics reasoned would be hard to tell apart at sea, a major issue in a time of war. The white and blue is still used by the Icelandic Youth Association, nationalists and at political events.

References

See also
 Flag of Orkney
 Flag of Scotland
 List of Scottish flags
 Nordic Cross Flag

Shetland
Flag
Nordic Cross flags
Flags introduced in 1969